Events from the year 1634 in Denmark.

Incumbents
 Monarch – Christian IV

Events

 5 October  The grand wedding of Christian, Prince-Elect of Denmark and Magdalene Sibylle of Saxony is celebrated in Copenhagen.
22 December – The Copenhagen Skipper's Guild was founded.

Culture

Art
 Jørgen Ringnis completes an elaborately carved  new pulpit for Stubbekøbing Church.

Births
15 December – Thomas Kingo, bishop, poet and hymn-writer (d. 1703).

Deaths
26 March – Jens Hermansson Juel, Danish nobleman who served as Governor-general of Norway (b. 1580).

References

External links

 
Denmark
Years of the 17th century in Denmark